Tom Vanderbilt (born 1968) is an American journalist, blogger, and author of the best-selling book, Traffic: Why We Drive the Way We Do (and What It Says About Us).
His traffic book was published on November 13 2009, made in various parts of the world: some like Barcelona Spain, Mexico City, New York United States, Tokyo Japan, etc.

Career
A freelancer, Vanderbilt has contributed articles on a broad range of subjects encompassing design, technology, science, and culture to such publications as  Slate, Wired, The London Review of Books, Artforum, The Financial Times, Rolling Stone, New York Times Magazine, Harvard Design Magazine, Cabinet, Metropolis, Design Observer, The Wilson Quarterly, and Popular Science.

In 2002, he published his first full-length book, Survival City: Adventures Among the Ruins of Atomic America. H-Net Reviews said of the book, "Survival City offers an insightful exploration of the ruins of atomic America that demands attention in our current moment. In the poignant aftermath of September 11 the futility of Cold War architecture suggested throughout the book takes on new resonance."

After three years of research, in 2008 he released Traffic which, according to the publisher Knopf’s promotional material, had a first run printing of 150,000 copies and was a feature of the Book of the Month Club. The Wall Street Journal called Traffic, “a fascinating survey of the oddities and etiquette of driving”. The Boston Globe wrote of the book's genesis: "He found no serious general books about [driving] but did find a mountain of research. So for three years he immersed himself in the subject, traveled around the world, interviewing drivers, researchers, and traffic engineers. With almost 90 pages of footnotes, the book is a bottomless compendium of research."  Some of this research began by asking a question on the community weblog  Metafilter in 2005.  While Vanderbilt found the responses useful, mentioning the site during a Boing Boing ingenuity lecture; he referred to the site's users as "overeducated and over-opinionated geeks." His publisher, Knopf, neglected to request the right to reprint comments from the site from Metafilter's staff or from the quoted users.

He is a contributing editor to I.D. and Print, and a contributing writer for the blog Design Observer. He is also a visiting scholar at New York University’s Rudin Center for Transportation Policy and Management.

Personal life
Tom Vanderbilt was born in Oak Forest, Illinois and raised in Wisconsin. He is a graduate of the University of Wisconsin-Madison. He now resides in Brooklyn, New York. He is married to Jancee Dunn, a former features writer for Rolling Stone.

Vanderbilt was a contestant on the game show Jeopardy!, appearing on an episode which aired on December 30, 2011.

Publications

As author
 The Sneaker Book: Anatomy of an Industry and an Icon, The New Press, 1998
 Survival City: Adventures Among the Ruins of Atomic America, Princeton Architectural Press, 2002
 Traffic: Why We Drive the Way We Do (and What It Says About Us), Knopf, 2008
 You May Also Like: Taste in an Age of Endless Choice, Penguin Random House, May 2016
 Beginners: The Curious Power of Lifelong Learning, Knopf, 2021

As contributor
He has also contributed to a number of books, including:
 Season’s Gleamings: The Art of the Aluminum Christmas Tree, Melcher Media, 2004 (afterword)
 Supercade: A Visual History of the Videogame Age, The MIT Press,
 Commodify Your Dissent: Salvos from the Baffler, W.W. Norton,
 Boob Jubilee: The Mad Cultural Politics of the New Economy (W.W. Norton), and
 The World and the Wild (University of Arizona Press).

References

External links

 Tom Vanderbilt's Twitter page
 Tom Vanderbilt’s Flickr page
 NPR article and interview (audio), July 28, 2008
 Google Lecture, August 15, 2008
 Video discussion with Vanderbilt about his works on Bloggingheads.tv

Online articles
 Harvard Design Review, It’s a Mall World After All: Disney, Design, and the American Dream, Fall 1999
 New York Times, Walker in the Wireless City, November 24, 2002
 New York Times, When Pedestrians Get Mixed Signals, February 1, 2014
 Slate, Courier, Dispatched: How the U.S. State Department put the kibosh on the typewriter font., February 20, 2004
 Slate U.S. Army's New ClothesWhy has the Army redesigned its uniforms?, Sept. 8, 2004
 The Guardian Is this Bush's secret bunker?, August 28, 2006

1968 births
Jeopardy! contestants
Living people
People from Brooklyn
Writers from New York (state)
Writers from Wisconsin
Date of birth missing (living people)
American male writers
People from Oak Forest, Illinois